Bjarni Friðriksson (born 29 May 1956) is a retired Icelandic judoka. At the 1984 Summer Olympics he won the bronze medal in the men's half heavyweight (95 kg) category, together with Günther Neureuther of West Germany. He remains the most successful Icelandic judoka to date. He also competed at the 1980, 1988 and the 1992 Summer Olympics.

Achievements

References

External links
 
 
 
 

1956 births
Living people
Bjarni Fridriksson
Judoka at the 1980 Summer Olympics
Judoka at the 1984 Summer Olympics
Judoka at the 1988 Summer Olympics
Judoka at the 1992 Summer Olympics
Bjarni Fridriksson
Bjarni Fridriksson
Olympic medalists in judo
Medalists at the 1984 Summer Olympics
21st-century Icelandic people
20th-century Icelandic people